The Hector J. Robinson Observatory, located in Lincoln Park, Michigan, is an Astronomical Observatory that features a 14-inch (360 mm) Celestron SCT telescope. Following renovation, the observatory resumed operations in September 2009,  with  First light ceremonies taking place in early September of that same year.

History

In 1961, after Hector Robinson's science classes had built several small telescopes, the idea arose to construct a much larger instrument, which was among the largest available to pre-college students anywhere in America.

Before being coated with reflective aluminum, the mirror blank was ground, tested and polished to achieve the right parabolic curve by teams of students using various grades of carborundum. 

On completion, with the addition of a cradle and equatorial mount, the telescope was stored in  Hector's  science classroom and, on clear evenings, it was carried outside and mounted on a stand for use.

In 1964, the Board of Education authorized  construction of a 14 foot (4.3m) diameter by 8 feet (2.4m) high cement block building, topped off with a rotating metal dome and retractable shutter to house the instrument.  The observatory footings and  a central piling were poured in early 1964 with the Observatory becoming operational in 1965.

Renovation and Upgrading
After Hector's retirement in 1966, interest in the operation waned until in 1970, after several years of infrequent use, students and several educators decided to renovate the observatory. In 1971, a students' Astronomy Club was formed to use the observatory, with the aim of furthering knowledge of astronomy. New eyepieces and other items were collected over the following four years and the instrument saw frequent use by the club.

In the summer of 1975, the telescope mirror was improved to one-tenth wavelength by a process of re-figuring and re-aluminumizing and in the Fall, the Astronomy Club was gifted a 35mm SLR camera and began to experiment with Astrophotography, using the moon and Jupiter as the first "subjects".

The  Club were active in working to increase use of the observatory: 

"Augmenting the existing eyepieces with new ones is planned, as well as obtaining more photographic equipment. Further improvements in the telescope mounting and the acquisition of a clock-drive system will help to realize the full, tremendous potential of the telescope. Expansion of the Club membership is also planned, as well as the possibility of fabricating new telescopes."

"The Hector J. Robinson Observatory is truly an invaluable asset to the school system and community, and the telescope it houses is one of the finest to be found. The foresight and diligence of Hector Robinson and his students of 1961–64 has produced a history and a future filled with the pleasures of accomplishment and the thrill of discovery, which are immense beyond measure."

A reprint of the re-naming resolution and a description of the telescope and it's operation can be seen in the dedication flyer written by Ron Greenough. 

Between 1974-1977, the Astronomy Club was sponsored by Bruce Coultas, an 8th grade principal at Huff Jr. High in Lincoln Park, Michigan.  During this time Club Members built three further telescopes, to learn the skills required.  The rich field instrument, which augmented the narrow field of view of the main  telescope, was mounted inside the observatory. 

Coultas purchased the necessary parts to construct his own  Newtonian F5 reflector. Optical expert and Detroit Astronomical Society member Mike Manyak, of Wyandotte Michigan, became a sponsor and curator for the observatory. With Manyak's help, the club members were able to produce three telescopes. The club performed the most work on their own  Newtonian, which was the second scope to be built at that time. The main mirrors were both ground by the club using mirror kits. Actual final figuring of the parabolic curves was performed by Manyak, as the mirrors had a Turned Down Edge problem. TDE (turned down edge) is a problem that plagues mirror builders of all skill levels, particularly beginners.

The first and second telescopes built during the 1977 time period had fiberglass tubes, which the club fiber glassed and sanded, then painted powder blue. The third small telescope had a simple painted cardboard tube and was very lightweight.

The third telescope was a small  F4 reflector, which was the student president's personal telescope. This optically patterned after an Edmund Astroscan 2000 sold at the time. This last mirror was primarily ground and polished by the student president, but Manyak did the final finishing and testing using a Foucault tester in Wyandotte Michigan.

The  Newtonian was housed in the observatory with the main  telescope in 1977 when it was built. An article in the local Mellus Newspaper shows some of the club members "polishing" the mirror for the  Newtonian. At that time, the club had the most members on record, with 35 members at its peak. However, approximately a third of the members were actually active in the club.

The club remained active for only a few more years. Huff Jr. High school was eventually torn down. A flat field existed there for some years, before a middle school was built again. The observatory and football field remained next to the old Huff School site, still adjacent to Lincoln Park High school.

Mike Manyak was the curator and still opened up the observatory for a time. According to a nearby neighbor, the observatory stayed in use until the early 1980s. Manyak was involved with astronomy until he died in 1998.

The observatory went into a dormant period after 1982. Bruce Coultas died, and without a middle school club, there was little interest in the observatory. During the 1970s, those in high school were, for the most part, not interested in the observatory or club, and viewed it as a "Jr. High" club or interest. The observatory was ultimately closed at an unknown date preceding the renovation. Physical work in restoring the observatory began in late 2008.

Both telescopes sat in the observatory unused for years up until 2008. In 2001 Dr. Timothy Dey learned about the observatory and first surveyed the site. As an amateur astronomer in Lincoln Park, Dey sought out a means to reactivate the observatory and bring it back into use. Dey worked with Leo Macmaster, an 8th grade science teacher, to apply for funding grants to revitalize the observatory. They successfully won a grant from Toshiba Incorporated. The grant, initially larger, was reduced from its initial award due to the economic downturn of 2008. The observatory was found to still house the original telescope and the  Newtonian reflector, but over the years, many starlings had nested in the observatory and many bird droppings coated the mirrors of both instruments. The observatory had to be repaired and the older instruments removed. Parts of the original scaffolding used to climb up and view through the old  Newtonian were used as a part of a raised floor. The SCT telescope has an eyepiece at the back of the telescope.

The  Newtonian had the same problems, with the acid from the bird droppings etching the previously fine surface of both mirrors. The Ford Amateur Astronomy Club (located in Dearborn Michigan) helped lead the way with their Astronomical expertise. Joseph Griggs construction company, led by Lions Club member J. R. Griggs helped much in building restoration and construction of a new raised floor, wiring, cleanup and painting. Joseph Griggs was a member of Hector J Robinson's class back in the 1960s and actually worked on the mirror with many other students when the first telescope was being built. So old students were returning and volunteering to help restore the new observatory. There was even help from the mayor of Lincoln Park who helped find resources to help us get a cement path to the observatory.

Since 2009, the new main telescope has been operational and the old telescope has been removed. The  Newtonian built in 1977 was initially scrapped, but was salvaged from a scrapyard by a former member of the astronomy club. It's unclear what will happen with the salvaged telescope.

The new main telescope mounted in the observatory is a Celestron C-14. It has computer control, go to, and tracking capability as well as astrophotography capability. The observatory is planned have a Wi-Fi hookup along with numerous other upgrades. One desired upgrade would allow the observatory to be linked into a remote control network, allowing children from other schools to observe through it over the internet. A network of schools uses this type of internet link to share telescopes and allow day viewing using telescopes linked in on the other side of the world, in a nighttime environment.

Telescopes

Past
 telescope (1964) - retired, to be put into the museum.
 Newtonian reflector (1977) - removed, may be repaired, but not currently in use.

Current
 Celestron Schmidt-Cassegrain telescope (2009) - installed, to be in use September 2009.
Lunt 35mm Solar scope (a special scope to view the sun) - mounted on C-14
 80mm F7 Meade APO Refractor - mounted on C-14

See also
 List of astronomical observatories

References

External links
Observatory blog
Ford Amateur Astronomy Club
Dey Group Link on Observatory Project

Astronomical observatories in Michigan
Buildings and structures in Wayne County, Michigan
1964 establishments in Michigan
Tourist attractions in Wayne County, Michigan